Carl Nils Stefan Sandborg né Johansson (born 25 March 1970) is a senior Swedish Army officer. He currently serves as the Chief of Home Guard since 2018.

Early life
Sandborg was born on 25 March 1970 in Linköping Saint Lawrence Parish (Linköpings S:t Lars församling), Östergötland County, Sweden.

Career
Sandborg graduated from the Military Academy Karlberg in 1993 and was commissioned as an officer and appointed second lieutenant and was assigned to the Life Grenadier Brigade (Livgrenadjärbrigaden) in Linköping. He served there until the brigade was disbanded on 31 December 1997. From 1998 he served in the Life Guards Brigade (Livgardesbrigaden), where he was promoted to captain the same year. In the mid-2000s, he served as a major and commander of the Life company in the Life Guards in Kungsängen. In 2009, Sandborg graduated with a master's degree from Forsvarets stabsskole in Oslo, Norway where he enrolled as a foreign exchange student two years prior.

Later in his career, he was deputy commander of the Life Guards and has also held various positions at the Swedish Armed Forces Headquarters in Stockholm. On 16 November 2015, Sandborg took over as commander of the 2nd Brigade (Andra brigaden) and also as deputy commander of the Skaraborg Regiment in Skövde (with appointment no later than 30 September 2019). From 1 January 2018, Sandborg was head of the Home Guard Department (Rikshemvärnsavdelningen) at the Swedish Armed Forces Headquarters (with appointment no later than 31 July 2018). In the summer of 2018, Sandborg was promoted to major general and appointed Chief of Home Guard and on 1 September 2018, he succeeded Major General Roland Ekenberg to the post. He in turn was succeeded by Major General Laura Swaan Wrede on 1 October 2022. Sandborg was made available to the Chief of Armed Forces Training & Procurement, Lieutenant General Johan Svensson from 1 October until 31 December 2022.

Sandborg has been a member of the Swedish Armed Forces Board of Tradition (Försvarets traditionsnämnd), a unit within the National Swedish Museums of Military History (Statens försvarshistoriska museer), which handles issues of tradition within the Swedish Armed Forces.

Personal life
Sandborg is married to Caroline Sandborg. Together they have two children.

Dates of rank
1993 – Second lieutenant
???? – Lieutenant
1998 – Captain
???? – Major
???? – Lieutenant colonel
???? – Colonel
1 September 2018 – Major general

Awards and decorations

Swedish
   Swedish Armed Forces Conscript Medal
   Swedish Armed Forces International Service Medal
   Home Guard Petri Medal in silver (HvPetriSM) with laurel wreath (2019)
   National Swedish Museums of Military History Medal of Merit
   Life Guards Medal of Merit
   Life Grenadier Regiment (I 4) Commemorative Medal in silver (LivgregSMM)

Foreign
   Cross for the Four Day Marches
   Home Guard Badge of Merit (Hjemmevaernets fortjensttegn) (6 November 2020)
   NATO Non-Article 5 medal for ISAF

References

1970 births
Living people
Swedish Army major generals
People from Linköping